Rilo Kiley, also known as The Initial Friend EP, is the first release by Los Angeles–based rock band Rilo Kiley. It was initially released independently in 1999 under the title Rilo Kiley. It was subsequently re-pressed in 2000 and again in 2001, under the name The Initial Friend EP with an alternate track-listing and cover. All three releases commonly sell on eBay for between $250–400 and are fairly rare.

The recording sessions for the EP were funded by comedian and actor Dave Foley, who was an early fan of the band and had attended their first concert in January 1998.

"Frug," which references the 1960s dance of the same name, and "85" were included in the soundtrack to the Christina Ricci film Desert Blue,  which led to the band's heightened popularity and eventual signing to a record label.  "Frug" was also the band's first music video.

"Frug" was later included as the final song on the band's B-sides and rarities compilation, Rkives.

The EP was reissued 2 October 2020 on the Little Record Company label on streaming services and originally due on vinyl as well.  The vinyl was finally released 20 November 2020 because of production delays and was sold-out during pre-order before the release date.

Track listing
All songs written by Jenny Lewis and Blake Sennett.

References

Rilo Kiley albums
1999 debut EPs
Self-released EPs